Rory Gamble (born 1956) is an American factory worker and trade unionist. In November 2019, he became the acting president of the United Auto Workers (UAW) following the abrupt resignation of his predecessor, Gary Jones. Jones was charged with and later convicted on fraud charges. He became the first African-American president of the UAW approximately one month after the conclusion of the 2019 General Motors strike. Because of the scandal which brought him to the position of president, UAW faced a potential federal takeover, which he was able to avoid by agreeing  to financial safeguards and a court-appointed monitor to oversee operations for six years as well as direct election of UAW officers by membership. On June 30, 2021, Gamble retired from the post and was replaced by Ray Curry. In July 2022, Gamble was awarded the title of "President Emeritus" by the UAW.

References

1956 births
Living people
Presidents of the United Auto Workers
African-American trade unionists
21st-century African-American people
20th-century African-American people